Sikhi in Greece dates back to 1942, when during the Axis occupation of the country, the Sikhs came to the country as a part of the British Indian Army.

History 

Sikhs have fought and passed through Greece in both World Wars, in large number as part of the British Indian Army. Guru Nanak is also known to have passed through Greece in one of his journeys. A cemetery of Sikh soldiers of the British Indian Army, still exists in Salonika. It was built in 1920, to bury the bodies of the Sikh soldiers of the First World War. However, the first Sikh community was formed in the 1950s by Sikh immigrants. They worked as farmers or fishermen in the Greek islands. Till the 1970s, the population of Sikhs in Greece was less than 200 people. After the 1970s, Sikh immigrants came to Greece through Turkey. Some of them started their own farm stores and recruited other immigrants to work with them.

In the 1990s the number of immigrants further increased. The Sikh community in Athens formed a small organization for their religious and social needs, which led to the building of Gurudwara Shri Guru Nanak Darbar. They called a granthi, brought some saroops of Guru Granth Sahib and rented a large industrial space that served as the temple. It was known by the Greeks as the "Indian Organization of Tavros, Athens", however the Punjabi characters on the temple board translate to "Sikh Temple Shri Guru Nanak Darbar, Athens". This was done to prevent the possible future attacks on a foreign religious monument. Following Athens' Sikh community, some other Sikh immigrants also made temples in Oinofita, Oropos, Kranidi and Thebes. A large place has been bought by the committee of one of the old Gurdwaras of Oinofita, for the construction of new Gurdwara, outside Schimatari and near to the Military Airport of Tanagra. Even though a new construction of a Gurdwara needs a lot of money, most of the needed money has been donated by nearby-living Sikhs as Daswand. The saroop of Guru Granth Sahib was moved from the old building and moved to the new one, even though it is only half complete. It is the only non-rented Gurdwara in Greece. The construction is planned to finish in 2018.

Religious freedom 
The Sikhs are free to wear turbans except when riding motorcycles. They are free to wear the Five Ks except the kirpan in schools and public places. There are still many cases of  discrimination against the Sikhs in Greece.

Present 
The number of Sikhs living in Greece is estimated to be around 20, 000. Their main centers are Athens, Megara, Chalkida and Psachna. Sikhs have the lowest number of people in prison. Sikhs in Greece consist of only two generations, the one that migrated from India and the other that was born there. Migration to Greece is very unpopular among Punjabis, in general and Sikhs in particular. Practising Sikhs who wear turbans are often confused with Pakistanis or Radical Muslims and are often called racist names, assaulted and bullied on streets and schools. Attacks on Sikh properties particularly on Sikh Gurudwaras have been frequent, since the rise of Neo-nazi groups. Sikhs in Greece have still a long way to go to win many of their rights. Many Sikhs tend to migrate to other western countries like Britain and Canada, where the Sikh community is well-established.

Attack on Sikh temples 

More than three times, Molotov cocktail bottles have been thrown at the complex of the Athens Gurdwara. A small-scale demonstration was made by the Greek residents of Schimatari-Tanagra against the building of the new Gurdwara in Schimatari. The police, who were called for help by Sikhs, forced the mob to retire but they arrested many of the builders and charged them for not having certain licenses. The police released them after some hours. Two gurdwaras in Marathon were attacked with gunshots with no reported casualty. These attacks are said to be common by local Sikhs and are believed to be racially motivated crimes incited by Neo-Nazi parties.

References 

 

Greece
Religion in Greece
Greece–India relations